Fumarioideae is a subfamily of the family Papaveraceae (the poppy family). It was formerly treated as a separate family, the Fumariaceae (the fumitory, fumewort or bleeding-heart family). It consists of about 575 species of herbaceous plants in 20 genera, native to the Northern Hemisphere and South Africa. The largest genus is Corydalis (with 470 species).

Description

Flower shape
Plants in the fumitory subfamily are easily recognised by their peculiar flowers with two dissimilar pairs of petals. One or both of the outer petals is usually spurred, and the inner petals are connected at tip.

There are two types of flowers. A given genus has one type or the other. Dicentra has flowers with two planes of symmetry, and Corydalis has flowers with one plane of symmetry (zygomorphic).

Leaves
Most species have compound leaves.

Taxonomy
The APG IV system of 2016 (unchanged from the earlier 1998 APG system, the 2003 APG II system, and the APG III system of 2009) includes the former family Fumariaceae within the Papaveraceae. The APG II system provided for its optional segregation as a separate family, but this option is not provided in the current APG IV system or the APG III system.

Genera
There are 20 genera:

See also
 Bicuculline, a toxin found in plans of this subfamily

External links

Fumariaceae , Hypecoaceae in L. Watson and M.J. Dallwitz (1992 onwards). The families of flowering plants: descriptions, illustrations, identification, information retrieval. Version: 3 May 2006. https://web.archive.org/web/20070103200438/http://delta-intkey.com/.
Flora of North America
Flora of Pakistan
Hypecoaceae of Mongolia in FloraGREIF

 
Eudicot subfamilies